Jesminder (Hindi : जेस्मिन्देर) is a Hindu/Punjabi Indian feminine given name, which means "flower queen" and "glory of god".

Fictional characters 
Jesminder Bhamra, from Gurinder Chadha's 2002 film Bend It Like Beckham.
Jesminder Bheeda, a premade Sim from The Sims 4 expansion pack The Sims 4: City Living.

External links 
Behind the Name

Hindu given names
Indian feminine given names